Andrei Medardovich Zayonchkovsky  ( – 22 March 1926) commanded the defence of the Romanian-Bulgarian border in Dobruja upon Romania's entry into World War I in August 1916.

Biography

After graduation from the Nicholas School of Military Engineering (Nikolaevskoe Inzhenernoe Uchilishche) in 1882, Zayonchkovsky served in the 5th Sapper Battalion. In 1888 he graduated from the General Staff Academy and served in various staff positions. 

During the Russo-Japanese War he commanded the 85th Vyborg Infantry Regiment and the 2nd brigade of the 3rd Siberian Infantry Division. 

During World War I Zayonchkovsky commanded first the 30th Army Corps. Following Romania's entry into the war on 27 August 1916, he commanded the Russian-Romanian Dobruja Army in charge of defending Dobruja against the Central Powers. He was relieved by general Dmitry Shcherbachev in April 1917 and was in retirement by the time of the October Revolution. 

In 1918 he joined the Red Army, serving in various staff positions. After the end of the Russian Civil War he switched to teaching in the Red Army Military Academy and writing. He wrote a two-volume overview of World War I military operations.

While a professor, "Zayonchkovsky worked as an agent for the Soviet secret police at the same time he was head of the conspiratorial anti-Bolshevik Monarchist Union (The Trust)."

References

External links
Short biography

1862 births
1926 deaths
People from Oryol
People from Orlovsky Uyezd (Oryol Governorate)
Russian nobility
Imperial Russian Army generals
Russian military historians
Historians of World War I
Russian military writers
Military Engineering-Technical University alumni
Russian military personnel of the Russo-Japanese War
Russian military personnel of World War I
Soviet military personnel of the Russian Civil War
Recipients of the Order of St. Vladimir, 2nd class
Recipients of the Order of St. Vladimir, 3rd class
Recipients of the Order of St. Vladimir, 4th class
Recipients of the Order of the White Eagle (Russia)
Recipients of the Order of St. Anna, 1st class
Recipients of the Order of St. Anna, 2nd class
Recipients of the Order of St. Anna, 3rd class
Recipients of the Order of Saint Stanislaus (Russian), 1st class
Recipients of the Order of Saint Stanislaus (Russian), 2nd class
Recipients of the Order of Saint Stanislaus (Russian), 3rd class
Recipients of the Gold Sword for Bravery
Commanders of the Order of Saints Maurice and Lazarus
Commanders of the Order of the Crown (Romania)